Yelena Vladimirovna Afanasyeva (born 27 March 1975) is a Russian politician. She was a member of the State Duma between 2003 and 2014. She is a member of the Liberal Democratic Party of Russia group. She attended Orenburg Educational Institute. She was selected to be a senator in the Federation Council from 26 September 2014, representing Orenburg Oblast.

References

External links
 Елена Афанасьева на сайте Совета Федерации

1975 births
Living people
Liberal Democratic Party of Russia politicians
21st-century Russian women politicians
People involved in plagiarism controversies
Diplomatic Academy of the Ministry of Foreign Affairs of the Russian Federation alumni
Fourth convocation members of the State Duma (Russian Federation)
Fifth convocation members of the State Duma (Russian Federation)
Sixth convocation members of the State Duma (Russian Federation)
Members of the Federation Council of Russia (after 2000)